The Renault Laguna is a large family car that was manufactured and marketed by Renault for 21 years in three body styles: hatchback, coupé, and estate. The first generation Laguna was launched in 1994, the second generation was introduced in 2000, and the third generation was built from October 2007 until 2015.

Concept car
The production Renault passenger models are unrelated to the concept car of the same name, the Laguna, a two seater roadster presented by the automaker during the 1990 Paris Motor Show. The name was also previously used from 1973 to 1976 by Chevrolet, for a top-of-the-line Chevelle model, the Chevrolet Chevelle Laguna.

First generation (X56; 1993)

With development underway from 1987, design work under Patrick Le Quément began in 1988, with a final design approval in March 1989, and a design freeze by the beginning of 1990. Road testing commenced in 1991 and continued through 1993. The first generation Renault Laguna was unveiled in November 1993, and launched in January 1994, as a replacement for the Renault 21, initially coming as a hatchback only.

At the Frankfurt Motor Show in September 1995, an estate version was introduced. This was known in some markets as the Laguna Sports Tourer, and replaced the 21 based Renault Savanna/Nevada. It was initially launched as a 1.8 RN/RT, 2.0RT/RXE, and 3.0V6. A sports pack with deep front spoiler, rear spoiler, and alloy wheels was available on 2.0 versions.

A limited-edition of 500 1.8RT Sport was made available in 1996, one hundred each of five colours including a metallic blue normally reserved for 2.0 models.

These limited editions sold out very quickly and so (to the annoyance of those who bought one of the original 500), the RT Sport was incorporated into the standard range at a cheaper price but having ABS, air conditioning, CD/Radio, and high-level brake light added as standard (all these were options on the more expensive, original 500). This coincided with Renault's participation in European Touring Car Championships.

The Laguna's equipment levels were generally much higher than the Renault 21. From launch, all models came with power steering, electric front windows, and remote central locking as standard. Most of the range had a driver's airbag. Later twin airbags, an anti-lock braking system, air conditioning, and a CD player became either optional extras or standard equipment.

In September 1996, minor upgrades included a new Laguna nameplate at the rear.

Engines

Facelift

The Laguna received a moderate facelift in April 1998, including a restyling of the hatchback and the sports tourer versions, and a redesigned front. This also included a different facelifted design of the taillights, most noticeable are the circular fog lights in the front.

The engines were updated and, in some markets, equipment levels were enhanced again. Five new engines featured in the completed facelifted lineup:
 K4M 1.6 16v (109 hp)
 F4P 1.8 16v (120 hp)
 F3R 2.0 (114 hp)
 N7Q 2.0 S (140 hp)
 F4R 2.0 16v (139 hp)
 L7X 3.0 V6 24v (190 hp)
 F9Q turbo 1.9 dTi (turbocharged direct injection) (98 hp)
 F9Q turbo 1.9 dCi (turbocharged common rail direct injection) (107 hp)
 G8T turbo 2.2 dT (turbocharged indirect injection) (113 hp)

For 2000, the final edition of this Laguna, the Laguna Concorde, was introduced. It included semi-leather seats and vocal warnings like "Welcome. The vehicle computer... is now checking systems for you". The onboard computer would notify the driver of any doors not being closed, lights left on, etc., weather ("Please brake carefully the road is watery"), or other faults in the electrical or mechanical circuits.

The onboard voice synthesizer warnings system was also available on the earlier 1998 RXE and V6 models. This is the same basic unit as used in the Renault Safrane.

The Mark 1 model has many bad reviews and reliability issues with everything from rear wheel bearing problems (a common Renault problem over several models) and heavy depreciation to problems with the bonnet latches (Renault uses an unusual system that is difficult to set up properly).

The reviews tended to be worse for the hatchback, with it suffering many more complaints and breakdowns than the estate variant, although no reasoning for this has been found.

The model of the Laguna Concorde was the last guise of the "old" Laguna to be marketed, prior to the release of the Laguna II at the end of 2000. The last of the Mk.1 Laguna's were registered in February 2001, and the Concorde range all feature a cream letter "C" on a dark green background. This was with the outline of an actual Concorde above the letter.

Second generation (X74; 2000)

After almost seven years in production, the original Laguna was replaced by an all new model in December 2000 for the 2001 model year. The engines were upgraded, and the equipment list made longer.

It was the first vehicle available in Europe to achieve five stars in the Euro NCAP crash test results, a feature that was soon followed by all other models in Renault's range. This generation was made available in hatchback or estate (Grandtour) styles only.

The Laguna was the first European family car, and the second European car to feature "keyless" entry and ignition, developed by Valeo. Instead of a key, it used a credit card style device to unlock the car and start the engine. The initial unreliability of this keyless system hurt Laguna's reputation as well as Renault's reputation in general. The styling of the second generation Laguna was heavily influenced by the Initiale concept car.

The Laguna II won the title Semperit Irish Car of the Year in November 2001.

The Laguna estate was only available with five seats, unlike the previous model which had seven seats as an option on some versions. It was badged as Sports Tourer or Grandtour, depending on the country. It was also marketed as a lifestyle vehicle, rather than a load carrier.

Facelift

The Laguna II was facelifted in March 2005, being launched in the Amsterdam Motor Show, according to Renault with improved security, driving performance, and comfort. It also had a moderate redesign of the air intake at the front of the car, now matching the design of the Megane. Sales commenced on 18 March 2005.

An electronic handbrake was also introduced, this was previously seen on the Scénic and Espace. The engines were much the same as before, with the 1.6 and 1.8 petrol units being offered in some markets, while other countries get a 2.0 petrol unit (turbo or non-turbo) and two diesels (1.9 or 2.2 direct injection).

Engines

Third generation (X91; 2007)

The Renault Laguna III was officially announced in a press release on June 4, 2007. The car was unveiled to the public at the Frankfurt Motor Show in September, and it went on sale in October 2007 for the 2008 model year. The car comes as a five-door hatchback (B91), as a five-door estate (K91) and a two-door coupé (D91).

This third generation is based on the platform D, shared with the Nissan Altima, the Nissan Teana, and the Nissan Murano. The Laguna III was the first car to have gone through the Aubevoye Technical Centre's Electro Magnetic Compatibility unit, in the course of its development.

It was first presented as a concept car, at the 2007 Frankfurt Motor Show, which followed some styling cues of the previous concept car, the Renault Fluence. The production version was revealed at the 2008 Cannes Film Festival, coinciding with the Monaco Formula 1 Grand Prix to take the wraps off.

The brand new V6 dCi engine delivers 235 hp (173 kW), while the new 3.5 litre petrol powered V6 offers 240 hp (175 kW). The Laguna Coupé later appeared before the general public at the Paris Motor Show in October 2008. In January 2008, spy images of a then possible Laguna Sedan appeared on the internet.

It was expected the car having appeared at the 2008 Paris Motor Show. However, this never made it to production. The Renault Latitude and the third generation (L43) Renault Samsung SM5, which is made by Renault Samsung Motors, South Korea is based on the Laguna III.

Facelift

A facelifted version of the Laguna III, called the Phase 2, débuted at the 2010 Paris Motor Show, and sales began in November 2010.

It has an aggressive front end compared to the older model. The range has been redesigned around six trim levels: Expression, Black Edition, Eco Business, Bose, GT 4Control, and Initiale. Engine side, the only change is the engine 1.5 dCi 110 hp, with CO2 emissions, decreased from 130 to 120g/km.

Engines

 1.5 L (1461 cc) 8 valve dCi I4; 110 bhp (81 kW); top speed: ; 0–100 km/h; 12.1 s; 2007–2015
 1.6 L (1598 cc) 16 valve I4; 110 bhp (81 kW); top speed: ; 0–100 km/h; 11.7 s; 2007–2010
 2.0 L (1997 cc) 16 valve I4; 140 bhp (103 kW); top speed: ; 0–100 km/h; 10.1 s; 2007–2015
 2.0 L (1998 cc) 16 valve Turbo I4; 170 bhp (125 kW); top speed: ; 0–100 km/h; 9.2 s; 2007–2015
 2.0 L (1998 cc) 16 valve Turbo I4; 205 bhp (150 kW); top speed: ; 0–100 km/h; 7.8 s; 2008–2015
 2.0 L (1995 cc) 16 valve dCi I4; 130 bhp (96 kW); top speed: ; 0–100 km/h; 10.6 s; 2007–2015
 2.0 L (1995 cc) 16 valve dCi I4; 150 bhp (110 kW); top speed: ; 0–100 km/h; 9.5 s; 2007–2015
 2.0 L (1995 cc) 16 valve dCi I4; 175 bhp (127 kW); top speed: ; 0–100 km/h; 8.7 ; 2007–2015
 2.0 L (1995 cc) 16 valve dCi I4; 180 bhp (131 kW); top speed: ; 0–100 km/h; 8.5 s; 2008–2015
 3.0 L (2993 cc) 24 valve dCi V6; 235 bhp (172 kW); top speed: ; 0–100 km/h; 7.3 s; 2008–2015
 3.5 L (3498 cc) 24 valve V6; 238 bhp (175 kW); ; 0–100 km/h; 7.4 s; 2008–2015

In February 2012, Renault discontinued the Laguna, Espace, Kangoo, Modus, and Wind lines in the United Kingdom. In 2015, both the Laguna and the Latitude were replaced by the Talisman. 54,840 Laguna Coupé have been produced.

Successor
Renault was rumoured considering changing the Laguna name to Atalans for the successor. In May 2015, Worldcarfans reported the successor would première on July 6, 2015, and would also replace the Latitude in the European market. The coupé version would also be discontinued, due to low demand. On 6 July 2015, Renault announced the successor will be called Talisman, as part of its intention of unifying nameplates worldwide.

References

Laguna
Hatchbacks
Station wagons
Coupés
Euro NCAP large family cars
Front-wheel-drive vehicles
Vehicles with four-wheel steering
2000s cars
2010s cars
Cars introduced in 1993
Touring cars